Charles Bennett Deane (November 1, 1898 – November 24, 1969) was a member of the United States House of Representatives from North Carolina.

Career
Deane was born in Ansonville Township, Anson County, North Carolina on  1 November 1898.  He attended Pee Dee Academy in Rockingham, North Carolina, and Trinity Park School, Durham, N.C., 1918-1920. Next Deane studied at and then graduated from the law department of Wake Forest College in 1923.  He was admitted to the bar the same year and commenced practice in Rockingham. He was an active Southern Baptist.

He was register of deeds of Richmond County, North Carolina from 1926–1934; attorney in the Wage and Hour Division, Department of Labor, Washington, D.C., in 1938 and 1939; in 1940, engaged in administrative law and in the general insurance business; served as chairman of the Richmond County Democratic executive committee 1932-1946; trustee of Wake Forest College.

He was elected as a Democrat to the Eightieth and to the four succeeding Congresses (January 3, 1947 – January 3, 1957); was an unsuccessful candidate for renomination in 1956 to the Eighty-fifth Congress.  Closely associated with the Moral Rearmament movement, he was defeated in the Democratic primary for a fifth term because he had refused to sign the controversial Southern Manifesto against desegregation of the races. Deane died in Rockingham, North Carolina, November 24, 1969, and was interred in Eastside Cemetery. His son was Charles B. Deane Jr. who served in the North Carolina General Assembly.

References

1898 births
1969 deaths
Wake Forest University alumni
People from Anson County, North Carolina
People from Rockingham, North Carolina
North Carolina lawyers
Democratic Party members of the United States House of Representatives from North Carolina
20th-century American politicians